Hastula penicillata is a species of sea snail, a marine gastropod mollusc in the family Terebridae, the auger snails.

Description
The length of the shell varies between 25 mm and 40 mm

Distribution
This marine species occurs off the Seychelles and Madagascar; off Easter Island and Hawaii; off New Zealand.

References

 Burch, R. D., 1965. New Terebrid Species from the Indo-Pacific Ocean and from the Gulf of Mexico, with New Locality Records and Provisional Lists of Soecies Collected in Western Australia and Sabah, Malaysia. The Veliger 7(4): 241-253
 Castelin M., Puillandre N., Kantor Yu. I., Modica M.V., Terryn Y., Cruaud C., Bouchet P. & Holford M. (2012) Macroevolution of venom apparatus innovations in auger snails (Gastropoda; Conoidea; Terebridae). Molecular Phylogenetics and Evolution 64: 21-44.
 Terryn Y. (2007). Terebridae: A Collectors Guide. Conchbooks & Natural Art. 59 pp + plates
 Severns, M. (2011). Shells of the Hawaiian Islands - The Sea Shells. Conchbooks, Hackenheim. 564 pp
 Liu, J.Y. [Ruiyu] (ed.). (2008). Checklist of marine biota of China seas. China Science Press. 1267 pp.
 Spencer, H.G., Marshall, B.A. & Willan, R.C. (2009). Checklist of New Zealand living Mollusca. Pp 196-219. in: Gordon, D.P. (ed.) New Zealand inventory of biodiversity. Volume one. Kingdom Animalia: Radiata, Lophotrochozoa, Deuterostomia. Canterbury University Press,

External links
 Hinds R.B. (1844 ["1843"). Descriptions of new shells, collected during the voyage of the Sulphur, and in Mr. Cuming's late visit to the Philippines. Proceedings of the Zoological Society of London. 11: 149-159]
 Spencer H.G., Willan R.C., Marshall B.A. & Murray T.J. (2011). Checklist of the Recent Mollusca Recorded from the New Zealand Exclusive Economic Zone
  Fedosov, A. E.; Malcolm, G.; Terryn, Y.; Gorson, J.; Modica, M. V.; Holford, M.; Puillandre, N. (2020). Phylogenetic classification of the family Terebridae (Neogastropoda: Conoidea). Journal of Molluscan Studies. 85(4): 359-388
 Gastropods.com: Hastula penicillata

Terebridae
Gastropods described in 1844